Amaro Huelva Betanzos (born July 18, 1973 in Rociana del Condado, Spain) is a Spanish politician and senator. He is currently the spokesperson of the Spanish Senate committee on Agriculture, Fisheries and Food Commission. Huelva was elected member of the Cortes Generales on January 13, 2016.

Huelva began his political career in 1995, where he worked for the Spanish Socialist Workers' Party as the general secretary of the party. In 1998, Amaro was elected Mayor of Rociana del Condado and held the position till 2003 before being elected councilor in Rociana town hall. During the 2015 general elections, he ran for the senate and was elected to represent Rociana del Condado. She has been a member of the Senate of Spain in the 11th, 12th, 13th and 14th legislature of Spain respectively. He currently sits on the Senate House committees on Culture and Sports Commission, Mixed Commission for Relations with the Court of Accounts and Ibero-American Affairs Commission.

References 

Living people
1973 births
People from Huelva
Members of the 13th Senate of Spain
Members of the 11th Senate of Spain
Members of the 12th Senate of Spain
Members of the 14th Senate of Spain